para-Bromoamphetamine (PBA), also known as 4-bromoamphetamine (4-BA), is an amphetamine derivative which acts as a serotonin-norepinephrine-dopamine releasing agent (SNDRA) and produces stimulant effects.

Another related compound is para-bromomethamphetamine known by the codename V-111.

Neurotoxicity
Like most other para-substituted amphetamines, PBA can be neurotoxic and may deplete the brain of 5-hydroxyindoles for at least a week.

See also 
 Substituted amphetamines
 4-Bromomethcathinone (4-BMC)
 4-Fluoroamphetamine (4-FA)
 para-Chloroamphetamine (PCA)
 para-Iodoamphetamine (PIA)

References 

Neurotoxins
Substituted amphetamines
Bromoarenes
Serotonin-norepinephrine-dopamine releasing agents